The following is a list of ecoregions in Russia, according to the Worldwide Fund for Nature (WWF):

Terrestrial

Temperate broadleaf and mixed forests

Caucasus mixed forests (Armenia, Azerbaijan, Georgia, Russia, Turkey)
Central European mixed forests (Austria, Belarus, Czech Republic, Germany, Lithuania, Moldova, Poland, Romania, Russia, Ukraine)
Crimean Submediterranean forest complex (Russia, Ukraine)
East European forest steppe (Bulgaria, Moldova, Romania, Russia, Ukraine)
Manchurian mixed forests (China, Russia, North Korea, South Korea)
Sarmatic mixed forests (Belarus, Estonia, Finland, Latvia, Lithuania, Norway, Russia, Sweden)
South Sakhalin-Kurile mixed forests (Russia)
Ussuri broadleaf and mixed forests (Russia)
West Siberian broadleaf and mixed forests (Russia)

Temperate coniferous forests

Altai montane forest and forest steppe (China, Kazakhstan, Mongolia, Russia)
Da Hinggan-Dzhagdy Mountains conifer forests (China, Russia)
Sayan montane conifer forests (Mongolia, Russia)

Boreal forests/taiga

East Siberian taiga (Russia)
Kamchatka-Kurile meadows and sparse forests (Russia)
Kamchatka-Kurile taiga (Russia)
Northeast Siberian taiga (Russia)
Okhotsk-Manchurian taiga (Russia)
Sakhalin Island taiga (Russia)
Scandinavian and Russian taiga (Finland, Norway, Russia, Sweden)
Trans-Baikal conifer forests (Mongolia, Russia)
Urals montane tundra and taiga (Russia)
West Siberian taiga (Russia)

Temperate grasslands, savannas and shrublands

Daurian forest steppe (China, Mongolia, Russia)
Kazakh forest steppe (Kazakhstan, Russia)
Kazakh steppe (Kazakhstan, Russia)
Mongolian-Manchurian grassland (China, Mongolia, Russia)
Pontic steppe (Moldova, Romania, Russia, Ukraine)
Sayan Intermontane steppe (Russia)
Selenge-Orkhon forest steppe (Mongolia, Russia)
South Siberian forest steppe (Russia)

Flooded grasslands and savannas

Amur meadow steppe (China, Russia)
Suiphun-Khanka meadows and forest meadows (Russia, China)

Montane grasslands and shrublands

Altai alpine meadow and tundra (China, Kazakhstan, Mongolia, Russia)
Sayan alpine meadows and tundra (Mongolia, Russia)

Tundra

Arctic desert (Russia, Norway)
Bering tundra  (Russia)
Cherskii-Kolyma mountain tundra (Russia)
Chukchi Peninsula tundra  (Russia)
Kamchatka Mountain tundra and forest tundra  (Russia)
Kola Peninsula tundra  (Norway, Russia)
Northeast Siberian coastal tundra  (Russia)
Northwest Russian-Novaya Zemlya tundra  (Russia)
Novosibirsk Islands arctic desert  (Russia)
Taimyr-Central Siberian tundra  (Russia)
Trans-Baikal Bald Mountain tundra  (Russia)
Wrangel Island arctic desert  (Russia)
Yamalagydanskaja tundra  (Russia)

Deserts and xeric shrublands

Caspian lowland desert (Iran, Kazakhstan, Russia, Turkmenistan)
Great Lakes Basin desert steppe (Mongolia, Russia)

Freshwater

Marine
(by realm and province)

Arctic realm
(no provinces identified)

Beaufort Sea-continental coast and shelf
Chukchi Sea
Eastern Bering Sea
East Siberian Sea
Laptev Sea
Kara Sea
North and East Barents Sea
White Sea

Temperate Northern Atlantic

Northern European Seas
Northern Norway and Finnmark
Baltic Sea

Temperate Northern Pacific

Cold Temperate Northwest Pacific
Sea of Okhotsk
Kamchatka Shelf and Coast
Northern Honshu
Sea of Japan

Cold Temperate Northeast Pacific
Aleutian Islands

 
Russia
Ecoregions